Andrea Curiale was a Roman Catholic prelate who served as Bishop of Lettere-Gragnano (1503–1517).

Biography
On 7 July 1503, Andrea Curiale was appointed during the papacy of Pope Alexander VI as Bishop of Lettere-Gragnano. 
He served as Bishop of Lettere-Gragnano until his resignation in 1517.

References

External links and additional sources
 (for Chronology of Bishops) 
 (for Chronology of Bishops)  

16th-century Italian Roman Catholic bishops
Bishops appointed by Pope Alexander VI